Lu Yen-hsun was the defending champion but chose not to defend his title.

Yūichi Sugita won the title after defeating Jordan Thompson 7–6(9–7), 7–6(10–8) in the final.

Seeds

Draw

Finals

Top half

Bottom half

External Links
Main Draw
Qualifying Draw

Aegon Surbiton Trophy - Men's Singles
2017 Men's Singles
Aegon Surbiton Trophy